Enakku Innoru Per Irukku is a 2016 Indian Tamil-language mafia comedy film directed by Sam Anton starring G. V. Prakash Kumar and Anandhi in the leading roles. Produced by Subaskaran Allirajah, who is from Lyca Productions, the film began production during December 2015.

Plot 
Johny (G. V. Prakash Kumar) is a happy-go-lucky guy who is mistaken as a notorious gangster by his lover Hema's (Anandhi) father Dass (Saravanan) aka Naina, an ageing gangster who wants a person to replace him as the Naina in Royapuram and become his son-in-law. Johny has a disease which causes him to repeat his previous words if he sees blood. How Johny eliminates his rivals and becomes the next Naina forms the rest of the story.

Cast 

G. V. Prakash Kumar as Johnny, a Haematophobia guy and tried to be a Naina in Royapuram.
Anandhi as Hema Johnny (Dhanam), Daughter of Doss.
Saravanan as Doss (Naina), Head of Royapuram.
Karunas as Finger Babu, Naina goon
Charle as Subbiah, Naina's right hand
VTV Ganesh as Benjamin, Doss's friend
Rajendran as Mahabali Maha
Nirosha as Dhanam
Yogi Babu as Ondi Puli
Swaminathan as Auto driver
Lollu Sabha Manohar as Asirvatham
Lawrence Ramu as Durai (Naina)
Shanmugam Muthusamy as chappai
Vijay Varadharaj as Glory
Mansoor Ali Khan (Cameo appearance)
Ponnambalam (Cameo appearance)
Kishore Rajkumar as Cameo appearance

Production 
Following the success of their previous collaboration, Darling (2015), director Sam Anton and G. V. Prakash Kumar began pre-production work on a film titled Kaipulla to be produced by Studio Green. However, the studio later backed out of the film. Lyca Productions revealed that they would produce the project during November 2015, and that it would become their second venture after Kaththi (2014).

The team held an official launch on 15 December 2015 and the first schedule subsequently began later that day, with the film developing under the working title of Enakku Innoru Per Irukku, a line taken from the film, Baashha (1995). The film progressed throughout the month with Nirosha and Saravanan joining the film's cast.

Soundtrack 
The music is composed by G. V. Prakash Kumar. The song Kannai Nambathey is a remix of the similarly-named song from the 1975 Tamil film Ninaithadhai Mudippavan.

References

External links 
 

2010s Tamil-language films
Indian action comedy films
Indian crime comedy films
Mafia comedy films
Films scored by G. V. Prakash Kumar
2016 action comedy films
2010s crime comedy films
2010s American films